Kevin Connolly (born March 5, 1974) is an American actor and director. He is best known for his role as Eric Murphy in the HBO series Entourage, and his role as the eldest son Ryan Malloy in the 1990s television sitcom Unhappily Ever After. Connolly is also a director, having directed many episodes of television as well as the films Gardener of Eden, Dear Eleanor, and Gotti.

Life and career
Connolly was born either in New York City, New York, or in Patchogue, New York, (sources differ) and raised in Medford, New York, on Long Island. His mother, Eileen, is of Irish descent. He has an older brother, Tim, a police detective for Suffolk County, New York police. Connolly graduated from Patchogue-Medford High School in 1992.

He began his career at age six, appearing in television commercials, including the "Betcha bite a chip" campaign for Chips Ahoy!. In 1990, he landed his first film role, as Chickie in Rocky V. Two years later, Connolly was cast as Shaun Kelly in the film adaptation of Myron Levoy's novel Alan & Naomi, and co-starred with Tobey Maguire in the short-lived Fox sitcom Great Scott!. His appearance in the series later earned him a Young Artist Award nomination for Best Young Actor Co-starring in a Television Series. He portrayed Dabney Coleman's son in the comedy film The Beverly Hillbillies. Connolly continued guest starring in television series including Wings, Getting By and the medical drama ER.

From 1995 to 1996, Connolly starred in Don's Plum alongside Maguire and Leonardo DiCaprio. Later that year, he landed the role of Ryan Malloy on the situation comedy Unhappily Ever After. The series also marked Connolly's directorial debut when he directed six episodes in its fourth season. In 2007, Connolly made his full-length movie directorial debut with the film Gardener of Eden, which premiered in April 2007 at the Tribeca Film Festival.

Connolly's best-known role is the character Eric Murphy, better known as "E", on the 2004-2011 HBO show Entourage. E is the manager and best friend of Vincent Chase, who is played by Adrian Grenier. In 2009, Connolly was nominated for the Golden Globe Award for Best Actor – Television Series Musical or Comedy for the role. Connolly reprised his role as Eric in the 2015 Entourage film adaptation.

In addition to television work, Connolly has appeared in several major motion pictures including Antwone Fisher, Secretariat, John Q., The Notebook and He's Just Not That Into You.

Connolly directed his first music video in 2008, for the song "Camera Phone" by rapper The Game, featuring Ne-Yo.

Connolly attended the 2010 NHL Entry Draft in Los Angeles and announced the final pick of the first round for his hometown New York Islanders. A lifelong Islanders fan, Connolly also directed the documentary film Big Shot, which screened at the 2013 TriBeCa Film Festival and the 2013 Hamptons International Film Festival The film revisits the fraud perpetrated by would-be Islanders owner John Spano in 1996.

He directed the 2018 film Gotti, which starred John Travolta as mobster John Gotti. Connolly was hired after a number of other directors, including Barry Levinson, were attached to the project during its lengthy development process. The film was a critical and commercial disaster, and is one of the few films to hold an approval rating of 0% on the website Rotten Tomatoes.

On July 15, 2020, Connolly was accused of rape by assistant costume designer Gracie Cox. The alleged assault occurred in December 2005, during a wrap party for Gardener of Eden. Connolly later denied the allegation through a spokesperson, stating that the encounter was consensual.

On January 11, 2021, it was announced that Connolly is expecting his first child with actress Zulay Henao. They had a baby girl, Kennedy Cruz, in early June 2021.

Filmography

Film

Television

Director

Awards and nominations

References

External links

 
 Profile on HBO.com
 Kevin Connolly in the Hot Seat. Interview by Alison Rosen of Time Out New York
 

1974 births
Male actors from New York (state)
American male child actors
American male film actors
American film directors
American people of Irish descent
American male television actors
American television directors
Living people
People from Patchogue, New York
20th-century American male actors
21st-century American male actors
People from Medford, New York